The qualification group 5 for the 2010 European Men's Handball Championship includes the national teams of Belarus, Bulgaria, Germany, Israel and Slovenia.

Standings

Fixtures and results

References
 EHF Euro Events – Men's EURO 2010 (qualification)

Qualification, Group 5